Secret Journey is a 1939 British thriller film directed by John Baxter and starring Basil Radford, Silvia St. Claire and Thorley Walters. The screenplay concerns a British agent who travels to Berlin to recover a top-secret invention that has been stolen by German intelligence.

The film was made at M.P. Studios, Elstree, by British National Films as a supporting feature.

Cast
 Basil Radford as John Richardson 
 Silvia St. Claire as Helen Richardson 
 Thorley Walters as Max von Reimer 
 Peter Gawthorne as Gen. von Reimer 
 Tom Helm as Capt. Benoit 
 Joss Ambler as Col. Blondin 
 George Hayes as Insp. Walter
 Megs Jenkins as Girl in glasses

References

Bibliography
 Chibnall, Steve. Quota Quickies: The Birth of the British 'B' Film. British Film Institute, 2007.
 Low, Rachael. Filmmaking in 1930s Britain. George Allen & Unwin, 1985.
 Wood, Linda. British Films, 1927-1939. British Film Institute, 1986.

External links

1939 films
1930s spy thriller films
British spy thriller films
1930s English-language films
Films directed by John Baxter
Films shot at Station Road Studios, Elstree
Quota quickies
British black-and-white films
1930s British films